The Sovereign Award for Outstanding Apprentice Jockey is a Canadian Thoroughbred horse racing honour. Created in 1975 by the Jockey Club of Canada, it is part of the Sovereign Awards program and is awarded annually to a jockey undergoing their apprenticeship.

Honourees:

1975 : Jeffrey Fell
1976 : Chris Loseth
1977 : Brad Smythe
1978 : Ron Hansen
1979 : Ray Creighton
1980 : Valerie Thompson
1981 : Richard Dos Ramos
1982 : Richard Dos Ramos
1983 : Robert King
1984 : Robert King
1985 : Nancy Jumpsen
1986 : Todd Kabel
1987 : James McAleney
1988 : James McAleney
1989 : Maree Richards
1990 : Mickey Walls
1991 : Mickey Walls †
1992 : Stanley Bethley
1993 : Constant Montpellier
1994 : Dave Wilson
1995 : Dave Wilson
1996 : Neil Poznansky †
1997 : Rui Pimentel
1998 : Helen Vanek
1999 : Ben Russell
2000 : Cory Clark
2001 : Chantal Sutherland
2002 : Chantal Sutherland
2003 : Julia Brimo
2004 : Corey Fraser
2005 : Emma-Jayne Wilson †
2006 : Emma-Jayne Wilson
2007 : Tyler Pizarro
2008 : Janine Stianson
2009 : Omar Moreno
2010 : Omar Moreno
2011 : Ryan Pacheco
2012 : Scott Williams
2013 : Skye Chernetz
2014 : Sheena Ryan
2015 : Erika Smilovsky
2016 : Kayla Pizarro
2017 : Rey Williams
2018 : Kazushi Kimura
2019 : Kazushi Kimura
2020 : Mauricio Malvez

A † denotes a jockey who also won that year's United States Eclipse Award for Outstanding Apprentice Jockey.

See also
Sovereign Award for Outstanding Jockey

References

Horse racing awards
Horse racing in Canada